Donald Montgomery (1808–1893) was a member of the Canadian Senate during the 19th century.

Donald Montgomery can also refer to:
 Donald E. Montgomery (1896–1957), American economist and labor activist
 Donald Montgomery (educator) (1848–1890), Canadian educator and politician from Prince Edward Island
 Don Montgomery (1931–2020), American state legislator and member of the Kansas state senate